Schwob is a surname. Notable people with the surname include:

 Lucy Schwob (Claude Cahun) (1894–1954), French photographer and writer
 Marcel Schwob (1867–1905), French writer

Variant surnames 
 Melita Švob (born 1931), Croatian biologist, scientist and historian

See also
 Schwab (disambiguation)

Ethnonymic surnames